Earthquakes in Kansas may refer to:
1867 Manhattan, Kansas earthquake
Oklahoma earthquake swarms (2009–present), including earthquakes in southern Kansas

Kansas
Earthquakes